Yorketown may refer to:
 Yorketown, New Jersey
 Yorketown, South Australia